This is a list of species in the bee genus Nomia.

Nomia species

References

 List
Nomia